John Howell Morrison is a composer and professor at the Longy School of Music in Cambridge, Massachusetts. While studying for his doctorate at the University of Michigan, he was a recipient of the Regents Fellowship.

References

External links

Living people

Year of birth missing (living people)